I Wasn't Born Yesterday is the second album by singer Sa-Fire, released in 1991. The album's penultimate track, "I Never Heard," was written by Michael Jackson and Paul Anka. Jackson's original recording was later released on October 12, 2009 as the single "This Is It."

Track listing

Personnel
Sa-Fire - vocals
Cynthia Todino, George Lamond, Dorian Holly, Christi Black, Julie Delgado, David Morales, Nadirah Ali, Tony Moran, Lilias White, Jackie Sirnley, Alex Brown, Marlene Jeter, Martinette Jenkins, Melanie Andrews, Margaret Furtado, Phaedra Butler, Rise Engelmann, Brian McKnight, Kipper Jones, Kenny Diaz, Connie Harvey, Janet Wright
The Natural "E" - rapping and backing vocals
John "Jubu" Smith, Frank Portalatin, Ted Karas, Michael Landau - guitars
C.P. Roth, Peter "Ski" Schwartz, Satoshi Tomile, Eric Kupper, Andy Marvel, Aaron Zigman, David Irwin, David Franks, "Yrreg Nworb" (the name of the song's producer, Gerry Brown, reversed), Mac Quayle, Carl Wheeler, Ian Prince - keyboards
Tom Keane - keyboard and synth programming

Charts
Singles - Billboard (North America)

References

1991 albums
Sa-Fire albums
Mercury Records albums